The Mindanao Visayas Basketball Association (MVBA) was a community-based amateur commercial basketball league in Southern Philippines sanctioned by the country's National Sports Association for basketball, the Samahang Basketbol ng Pilipinas (SBP).  The league is made up of teams from the Visayas and Mindanao.  Formal operations began on February 25, 2006 with the opening of the ML Kwarta Padala First Conference at the MSU-IIT Gym in Iligan City, Lanao del Norte.  Forward Mark Bonifacio of Montana Pawnshop-Davao made the first basket in league history during the opening game versus PacMan-GenSan.

The league is a brainchild of multi-titled coach and Cebu City Councilor Raul "Yayoy" D. Alcoseba, who wanted to have a Vis-Min league managed by Vis-Min people and based in the area.  With the financial backing of sports patron Michel J. Lhuillier, the dream became a reality in late 2005 as Alcoseba and his staff began the groundwork by talking to potential team owners and sponsors.

Former FIBA referee Jose "Boy" Murillo and PBA legend Wilfredo "Willy" Generalao were named as the MVBA's two co-equal commissioners, with Murillo in charge of the Visayas games and Generalao in Mindanao.  Gov. Oscar S. Moreno, team owner of Misamis Oriental, was unanimously elected as the MVBA's Chairman.

In 2008, it merged with the National Basketball Conference (NBC), and Third Force Inc. (TFI) to form the new Liga Pilipinas.

MVBA Teams

Visayas Division
Arthro Kontra Arthritis-Cebu
Cebu Landmaster-Mandaue
Cindy's-Tacloban
M. Lhuillier Kwarta Padala-Cebu City
Mantawi Traders/Talisay Aquastars
Toyota-Iloilo Warriors
West Negros College-Bacolod Mustangs

Mindanao Division
Cagayan de Oro Rapids
Duterte Agilas-Davao
Holcim MoneyGram-Misamis Oriental
Iligan Archangels
Lanao Royals
Montana Pawnshop-Davao
MP Warriors-General Santos

Guest Teams
Bacchus Energy Drink-Manila
Burger King Whoppers
Dazz 'Sang Patak Kitchen Specialists
Fifth Avenue Telecoms
Henkel-Sista Super Sealers
Hotel Fortuna (Iligan Crusaders)
Hotel Fortuna-Boljoon (University of the Visayas)
North Cotabato Braves
Pagadian Explorers
Pharex Medics
Spring Cooking Oil-Malabon
TeleTech Titans
Toyota-Balintawak Road Kings
Zamboanga Latinos

MVBA Champions

The league holds two long tournaments or conferences every season.  In between, a sprinkling of brief tournaments are held either as a warm-up for the coming conference or in honor of a special occasion.

2005
Gov. Gwen Garcia Cup: PacMan-GenSan
2006
Mayor Lawrence Cruz Cup: M. Lhuillier Kwarta Padala-Cebu City
First Conference: M. Lhuillier Kwarta Padala-Cebu City
Invitational: M. Lhuillier Kwarta Padala-Cebu City
Second Conference: M. Lhuillier Kwarta Padala-Cebu City
2007
Gov. Oscar Moreno Cup: M. Lhuillier Kwarta Padala-Cebu City
Cebu City Charter Cup: Heartvit-Tribu Guardo
First Conference: Holcim Pryce Pharma-MisOr
Invitational: M. Lhuillier Kwarta Padala-Cebu City
Hotel Fortuna Cup: Cebu Landmaster-Mandaue
Second Conference: M. Lhuillier Kwarta Padala-Cebu City
Christmas League: M. Lhuillier Kwarta Padala-Cebu City
2008
Sinulog Cup: M. Lhuillier Kwarta Padala-Cebu City

MVBA Most Valuable Players

2006
First Conference-Visayas: Jayford Rodriguez (M. Lhuillier)
First Conference-Mindanao: Louie Medalla (PacMan)
First Conference-Finals: Woodrow Enriquez (M. Lhuillier)
Second Conference-Visayas: Stephen Padilla (M. Lhuillier)
Second Conference-Mindanao: Gilbert Demape (MisOr)
Second Conference-Finals: Stephen Padilla (M. Lhuillier)
2007
First Conference: Franklin Nailon (MisOr)
Invitational: Danilo Aying (M. Lhuillier)
Second Conference-Visayas: Bruce Dacia (M. Lhuillier)
Second Conference-Mindanao: Lowell Briones (MisOr)
Second Conference-Finals: Bruce Dacia (M. Lhuillier)
2008
Sinulog Cup: Bruce Dacia and Woodrow Enriquez (M. Lhuillier)

PBA Call-Ups
The MVBA is proud that several of its alumni have made it to the professional Philippine Basketball Association (PBA).  Aside from rookies, several free agents have received their second chance at pro stardom after credible performances in the MVBA.  This listing is limited to those players who saw action in the regular conferences.
2006
Jimwell Torion (Landmaster) - Santa Lucia Realtors
Stephen Padilla (M. Lhuillier) - Air21 Express
Ernesto Billones (Landmaster) - Talk 'N Text Phone Pals
2007
JR Quinahan (Landmaster/Arthro) - Alaska Aces
Philip Butel (Montana) - Santa Lucia Realtors
Dale Singson (Landmaster) - Alaska Aces

MVBA Venues
In only two years, the MVBA has been literally around, playing official games in almost every major city or urban area in the Visayas and Mindanao.

New Cebu Coliseum
University of San Carlos Main Gym (Cebu City)
Mandaue City Cultural and Sports Center
Talisay City Sports Complex (Cebu)
Marcelo A. Barba Sports Center (Toledo City)
Mayor Experanza S. Binghay Memorial Cultural and Sports Complex (Balamban, Cebu)
Pinamungajan Sports Center (Pinamungajan, Cebu)
Talisay City Sports Complex (Negros Occidental)
University of San Agustin-Gym (Iloilo City)
Pototan Astrodome (Pototan, Iloilo)
Mindanao Civic Center (Tubod, Lanao del Norte)
Mindanao State University-Iligan Institute of Technology Gym (Iligan City)
Xavier University Gym (Cagayan de Oro City)
Liceo de Cagayan University Gym (Cagayan de Oro City)
Father Saturnino Urios University Gym (Butuan City)
Maramag Gymnasium (Maramag, Bukidnon)
Almendras Gymnasium (Davao City)
Panabo City Coliseum
Digos City Stadium
General Santos City Coliseum
Oval Plaza Covered Court (General Santos City)
South Cotabato Gym and Cultural Center (Koronadal City)

Media coverage
The MVBA games are broadcast via UHF station Cebu Catholic Television Network (CCTN-47) daily at 3:30PM, Philippine Standard Time.  The station's signal covers most of the Visayas and parts of Northern Mindanao. The MVBA broadcast panel is a combination of veteran and up and coming commentators led by Sandi Geronimo-Grumo, Randy Sacdalan, Anthony Servinio, John Montalvan and Brian Madronero.

Aside from television, the MVBA enjoys good print coverage from both local and national newspapers, tabloids and magazines.  An official league website is in the works for 2008.  For the moment, the MVBA has maintained a deal with Gameface.Ph as its official Internet media partner since 2006.

External links
MVBA Friendster
Basketball Cebu
Gameface (official internet media partner)

2006 establishments in the Philippines
Liga Pilipinas
Defunct basketball leagues in the Philippines
Sports leagues established in 2006